Coluber constrictor oaxaca, commonly known as the Mexican racer, is a nonvenomous colubrid snake, a subspecies of the eastern racer (Coluber constrictor).

Geographic range
It is found primarily in Mexico from Tamaulipas to Vera Cruz, with isolated records of it occurring in Nuevo León, Coahuila, Durango, Colima, Oaxaca and Chiapas. The subspecies also ranges as far north as the United States in southern Texas and as far south as Guatemala. It is known to intergrade with the eastern yellow-bellied racer (Coluber constrictor flaviventris).

Description
Adults of Coluber constrictor oaxaca are 51–102 cm (20-40 inches) in total length.

They are greenish dorsally and yellowish ventrally.  They have eight upper labials and eight lower labials.

Juveniles have dark, narrow, close-spaced crossbands on the anterior part of the body, unlike the mid-dorsal blotches of juveniles of most other subspecies of Coluber constrictor.

References

Further reading
 Jan, G. 1863. Elenco sistematico degli ofidi descritti e disegnati per l'iconografia generale. A. Lombardi. Milan. vii + 143 pp. (Coryphodon oaxaca, p. 63.)

External links
Natural History Miscellany: Mexican Racer (Coluber constrictor oaxaca) from the Davis Mountains of Texas

Colubrids
Reptiles of Mexico
Reptiles of Guatemala
Reptiles of the United States
Natural history of Oaxaca
Natural history of Tamaulipas